Lucien Alliot (17 November 1877 – 9 March 1967) was a French sculptor. His work was part of the sculpture event in the art competition at the 1924 Summer Olympics.

References

1877 births
1967 deaths
19th-century French sculptors
19th-century French male artists
20th-century French sculptors
20th-century French male artists
French male sculptors
Olympic competitors in art competitions
Sculptors from Paris